Eielson may refer to:
Carl Benjamin Eielson (1897-1929), American aviator
Jorge Eduardo Eielson (1924-2006), Peruvian poet
Various facilities named for Carl Benjamin Eielson:
Eielson Air Force Base, located near Fairbanks, Alaska
Ben Eielson Junior/Senior High School, located at Eielson AFB
Carl Ben Eielson Elementary School, located in Grand Forks, North Dakota